Ghimpețeni is a commune in Olt County, Muntenia, Romania. It is composed of two villages, Ghimpețeni and Ghimpețenii Noi. These were part of Nicolae Titulescu Commune until 2004, when they were split off.

References

Communes in Olt County
Localities in Muntenia